Sir Charles D'Oyly, 7th Baronet (1781–1845), was a British public official and painter from Dacca (now Dhaka). He was a member of the Bengal Civil Service based in Calcutta, Dacca and Patna from 1797 to 1838. Although he held senior positions with the East India Company's civil service, he is best known as an amateur artist who published many books featuring engravings and lithographs featuring Indian subject matter.

Life and career
Charles D'Oyly was born in Murshidabad, Bengal, India on 17 September 1781 into a family that had long served in India. He was the son of Sir John-Hadley D'Oyly, 6th Baronet and Diana Rochfort. His father was the East India Company's resident at the Court of Nawab Babar Ali of Murshidabad.

D'Oyly went to England with the family in 1785 and received his first formal education there. In 1798 he returned to India as Assistant to the Registrar in the Court of Appeal in Calcutta. In 1803 he was appointed Keeper of the Records in the Governor General's office, and in 1805, he married his cousin, Marian Greer, daughter of William Greer.

From 1808 to 1817, he was Collector of Dacca. Here, D'Oyly met George Chinnery, who spent a great deal of time staying with D’Oyly during his early career. The pair became close friends and went on several expeditions together. Chinnery had a considerable influence on the development of D'Oyly's artistic style and painted at least two portraits of the D'Oylys.

In 1815 or 1817 (the date is disputed), D'Oyly married Elizabeth Jane Ross, daughter of Major Thomas Ross. After his father's death in 1818, D'Oyly inherited the baronetage and received a knighthood; also in 1818, he became City Collector of Customs in Calcutta. Francis Rawdon-Hastings, Marquess of Hastings, the Governor-General, was very taken with D’Oyly, who served as the Governor's aide-de-camp whenever he was in Calcutta.

The D’Oylys were sociable, hospitable, witty conversationalists and active members of colonial society, but they were not snobs and disliked the formality and pretensions associated with English society in India.
They regularly invited new British arrivals as guests in their private home, often for extended periods.  Brian Houghton Hodgson stayed with the couple when he first arrived in India in the 1820s; the D’Oylys introduced him to society and helped him establish connections with high officials of the Indian government. Hodgson and the D’Oylys shared an interest in the arts, and became lifelong friends.

From 1821 to 1831, D'Oyly was Opium Agent of Bihar and Commercial Resident of Patna; this was one of his most productive periods, and he produced numerous paintings and sketches. In July 1824, he founded an amateur art society which he named "United Patna and Gaya Society" or "Behar School of Athens", with the objective of "the promotion of Arts and Sciences and […] the circulation of fun and merriment of all descriptions." He also established his own publishing operation, the Bihar Lithography Press, to publish his lithographs and engravings, employing Jairam Das, a Patna artist trained in the Mughal tradition, as his assistant.

Between 1832 and 1833, D'Oyly took leave at the Cape of Good Hope, returning to Calcutta to become the Senior Member of the Board of Customs, Salt, Opium and of the Marine. After working for the Company for forty years, D'Oyly's failing health compelled him to retire and leave India in 1838. The greater part of the rest of his life was spent in Italy; he died in Livorno on 21 September 1845 without issue.<ref>Debrett, J., The Baronetage of England, Volume 1, 1824, p. 325; 'The Peerage Online,http://www.thepeerage.com/p37206.htm</ref>

Works

D'Oyly sketched incessantly and took an active interest in the arts generally, finding these leisure pursuits to be an agreeable way to relieve the boredom associated with colonial life. He produced landscapes, scenes of Indian life, portraits, and caricatures, primarily in watercolour, and also wrote satirical verse.  His work was influenced by his friend, the painter, George Chinnery, who stayed with D’Oyly and his wife in Dacca in 1802–03. A unique feature of his illustrations is the representation of relations between colonials and Indians. Unlike other artists of the period, D’Oyly was not afraid to depict drunkenness and debauchery in his illustrations. His published work, which was invariably heavily illustrated, encompassed a variety of subject matter, from natural history to social satire, and was occasionally written in verse.

During his time in Dacca, he painted a wide variety of pictures, especially the Mughal ruins which he published in a folio-size book with fifteen engravings entitled Antiquities of Dacca in 1814, with reprints from 1823 onwards. A short historical account of Dacca was appended to each book, written by James Atkinson, with engravings by Edwin Landseer. Antiquities of Dacca became an important social document of the period.

In Patna, D’Oyly was at the centre of a flourishing artistic circle made up of both British and Indian artists. British artists in India, including D’Oyly, Chinnery and Webb Smith, exposed local native artists to landscapes, natural history and portraiture.Rekha, N., “The Patna School of Painting: A Brief History, 1760-1880,” Proceedings of the Indian History Congress, Vol. 72, no. I, 2011, pp. 997-1007, https://www.jstor.org/stable/44146791  On the other hand, native techniques and a local touch imbued the British paintings with an identifiable Anglo-Indian character; a blend of Indian and European traditions that ultimately became known as Company painting.

His 1828 work Tom Raw, the Griffin (which scholars believe was one of his earliest books, in around 1811) is an illustrated satirical novella in verse which relates the adventures of a cadet in the East India Company.

At times, he collaborated with other scholars. One such collaboration was with the diplomat and scholar Christopher Webb Smith, his wife's first cousin, whose primary interest was ornithology. They published Feathered Game of Hindostan (1828) and Oriental Ornithology (1829); Webb Smith depicted the birds and foliage, and D'Oyly the backgrounds. The two also worked on The Birds, Flowers, and Scenery of the Cape, which was never published. He also collaborated with Captain Thomas Williamson on The Costumes and Customs of Modern India (c. 1830).

Although his artistic output was an amateur activity in the sense that it did not interfere with his position at the East India Company, his work was far from amateurish. His scenes of British life in India in the early 19th-century attracted a large audience, especially amongst members of colonial society. His publications were sold in London where they were popular amongst those with an interest in the Orient.

He has been described as possessing "the accomplishments of a man of taste, sketched cleverly in watercolours, and [...] the leading dilettante of Calcutta society at that time"   and “the most prolific artist in India of his time”. Bishop Heber, who visited Patna in the 1840s, described D’Oyly as the “best gentleman artist I ever met”.

Select list of publications
The majority of his publications were folios of engravings or lithographs. Certain publications included a substantial amount of text. Those published in conjunction with Christopher Webb Smith, for example, included a two to three-page description accompanying each illustration, with the commentary provided by Captain Thomas Williamson.

Sole-authored

 Antiquities of Dacca, London, 1814 – a folio of 40 engravings 
 Behar Amateur Lithographic Scrapbook, Patna, Lithographic Press, 1830 – 36 lithographs (includes drawings by George Chinnery, Lady D’Oyly and others) 
 Tom Raw, the Griffin, 1828 – an illustrated social satire in verse 
 Indian Sports, Patna, Behar Lithographic Press, 1829 
 Costumes of India, Behar Lithographic Press, 1830 
 Sketches of the New Road in a Journey from Calcutta to Gyah, Asiatic Lithographic  Company's Press, 1830 
 Views of Calcutta and its Environs, 1848 
 Eight Months’ Experience of the Sepoy Revolt in 1857, Henry Shipp, 1891

Collaborations
 The European in India, Edward Orme, 1813 – with text by Thomas Williamson and illustrations by D’Oyly and others
 The Costumes and Customs of Modern India Edward Orme, London, 1813 - with text by Thomas Williamson and illustrations by Charles D’Oyly,
 Amateurs Repository of Indian Sketches, Asiatic Lithographic Company Press, 1828 (in collaboration with Philippe Savignhac, George Chinnery and James Princep and others) 
with text by Charles Williamson, illustrations by Charles D’Oyly and Christopher Webb Smith
 Oriental Ornithology, Behar Lithographic Press, Patna, 1829 – with text by Charles Williamson and illustrations by Charles D’Oyly and Christopher Webb Smith 

Legacy
A number of D’Oyly's publications, have been reprinted in recent editions. Other collections of drawings and notes were published posthumously. Two such works are Daily Life in the Early Eighteen-Thirties Illustrated with the Hitherto Unpublished Johannesburg Album of Sketches (1898) and The Cape Sketchbooks of Sir Charles D'Oyly 1832-1833 (1968).

In 1848 Dickinson & Co., 114 New Bond Street, London, published D'Oyly's Calcutta Drawings in a large folio-size book titled Views of Calcutta and its Environs in 1848. The original drawings for this work were probably made between 1833 and 1838, but some must have been completed between 1839 and 1845, when he was retired. The complete work was published after D'Oyly's death.

Gallery

Engravings from D'Oyly's Antiquities of Dacca first published c. 1814

Prints from D'Oyly's Costumes of India, 1830Prints from D'Oyly's Views of Calcutta and Environs, 1848

Arms

See also
 Company style
 List of Orientalist artists
 Orientalism

References

Further reading

 Losty, J.P., "A Career in Art: Sir Charles D'Oyly", in Under the Indian Sun: British Landscape Artists, P. Rohatgi and P. Godrej (eds), Bombay, 1995, pp. 81–106
 Archer, M., “The Talented Baronet: Charles D’Oyly and His Sketches,” Conoisseur'', vol. 175 November 1970, pp. 173–81

1781 births
1845 deaths
Baronets in the Baronetage of England
Orientalist painters